"Start Me Up" is a song by the English rock band the Rolling Stones from their 1981 album Tattoo You. Released as the album's lead single, it reached number one on Australian Kent Music Report, number two in Canada, number two on the Billboard Hot 100, number seven on the UK Singles Chart, and the top ten in a handful of European countries north of the Alps.

Writing and recording
The basic track "Start Me Up" was recorded during the January and March 1978 sessions for the Rolling Stones' album Some Girls. The song began as a reggae-rock track named "Never Stop", but after dozens of takes it was abandoned. "Start Me Up" was not chosen for the album and was saved for later use. Richards commented:

In 1981, with the band looking to tour, engineer Chris Kimsey proposed to lead singer Mick Jagger that archived songs could comprise the set. While searching through the vaults, Kimsey found the two takes of the song with a more rock vibe among some fifty reggae versions. Overdubs were completed on the track in early 1981 in New York City at the recording studios Electric Lady Studios and The Hit Factory. On the band's recording style for this track in particular, Kimsey commented in 2004:

The infectious "thump" to the song was achieved using mixer Bob Clearmountain's famed "bathroom reverb", a process involving the recording of some of the song's vocal and drum tracks with a miked speaker in the bathroom of the Power Station recording studio in New York City. It was there where final touches were added to the song, including Jagger's switch of the main lyrics from "start it up" to "start me up."

The song opens with what has since become a trademark riff for Richards. It is this, coupled with Charlie Watts' steady backbeat and Bill Wyman's echoing bass, that comprises most of the song. Lead guitarist Ronnie Wood can clearly be heard playing a layered variation of Richards' main riff (often live versions of the song are lengthened by giving Wood a solo near the middle of the song, pieces of which can be heard throughout the original recording). Throughout the song Jagger breaks in with a repeated bridge of "You make a grown man cry", followed by various pronouncements of his and his partner's sexual nature.

Percussion (cowbell and guiro) by Mike Carabello and handclaps by Jagger, Chris Kimsey and Barry Sage were added during overdub sessions in April and June 1981.

Billboard said that "its catchy refrain easily worms its way into the memory." Record World said that the song is highlighted by "biting, rauncy guitars and a rhythm kick that spanks hard."

A music video was produced for the single, directed by Michael Lindsay-Hogg. According to Lindsay-Hogg's recollection, Jagger and Watts proposed the collaboration to him over lunch with Jagger particularly keen to emulate the style of video shown on MTV, which he regarded as "the future". The subsequent production became one of the most programmed videos of MTV's early years.

Release
"Start Me Up" peaked at number seven on the UK Singles Charts in September 1981 and remains the last Rolling Stones song to appear in the UK top 10. In Australia, the song reached number one in November 1981. In the US, "Start Me Up" spent three weeks at number two on the Billboard Hot 100 chart in October and November 1981, the Stones' biggest hit of the 1980s in the United States.

It also spent 13 weeks atop the Billboard Top Tracks chart. This set a record for most weeks at #1 that was not broken until 1994, when Stone Temple Pilots' "Interstate Love Song" spent 15 weeks on top. The B-side is a slow blues number called "No Use in Crying", which is also included on Tattoo You.

"Start Me Up" is often used to open the Rolling Stones' live shows and has been featured on the live albums Still Life (recorded 1981, released 1982), Flashpoint (recorded 1989, released 1991), Live Licks (recorded 2003, released 2004), Shine a Light (recorded 2006, released 2008), and Hyde Park Live (2013). It also features on several Stones live concert films and DVD/Blu-ray sets: Let's Spend the Night Together (filmed 1981, released 1983), Stones at the Max (filmed 1990, released 1991), The Rolling Stones: Voodoo Lounge Live (filmed 1994, released 1995), Bridges to Babylon Tour '97–98 (filmed 1997, released 1998), Four Flicks (2003), The Biggest Bang (filmed 2006, released 2007), Shine a Light (filmed 2006, released 2008), Sweet Summer Sun: Hyde Park Live (2013), and Havana Moon (2016, bonus track). The song was the first of three songs played by the Stones at halftime during Super Bowl XL in 2006.

The song has been included on every major Stones compilation album since its release, including Rewind (1971–1984), Jump Back, Forty Licks and GRRR!. Writing for AllMusic, Stewart Mason noted, "there were hits after 'Start Me Up,' but at this remove, it's undeniable that this 1981 single was the last great Rolling Stones song." Rolling Stone magazine ranked it the 8th Best Sports Anthem.

Personnel
The Rolling Stones
Mick Jaggerlead vocals, backing vocals 
Keith Richardselectric lead guitar, backing vocals
Ronnie Woodelectric rhythm guitar, backing vocals
Bill Wymanbass guitar 
Charlie Wattsdrums

Additional personnel
Michael Carabellocowbell 
Barry Sagehandclaps

Charts

Weekly charts

Year-end charts

Certifications

Commercial usage
Microsoft paid about US$3 million to use this song in their Windows 95 marketing campaign. This was the first time that the Rolling Stones allowed a company to use their songs in an advertising campaign. In 2012, a remixed version of the song was used as the soundtrack to an Omega advertising campaign for their role as official timekeepers of the 2012 Summer Olympics.

See also
List of Billboard Mainstream Rock number-one songs of the 1980s

References

1981 singles
The Rolling Stones songs
Number-one singles in Australia
Songs written by Jagger–Richards
Windows 95
Song recordings produced by Jagger–Richards
Music videos directed by Michael Lindsay-Hogg
1981 songs